Seri Perdana is the official residence of the Prime Minister of Malaysia, located in Putrajaya, Malaysia.

History
Construction began in 1997 and was completed in 1999. The building shares similar architecture with Perdana Putra. The first resident of this house was Mahathir Mohamad, followed by Abdullah Ahmad Badawi, Najib Razak, Mahathir Mohamad for the second time, Muhyiddin Yassin, Ismail Sabri Yaakob, and Anwar Ibrahim.

Architecture
VIP Hall
Meeting Hall
Surau
Banquet Hall
Prime Minister's main house
Administration Office
Quarters house
South Garden
North Garden

See also 
Putrajaya

External links 
Seri Perdana

Official residences in Malaysia
Buildings and structures in Putrajaya
Prime ministerial residences
1999 establishments in Malaysia
Buildings and structures completed in 1999
20th-century architecture in Malaysia